What Heat is an album by Bokanté plus Metropole Orkest, released in September 2018.
This album was nominated for Best World Music Album in the 62nd Annual Grammy Awards.

Track listing
All compositions by Malika Tirolien and Michael League except track 4, lyrics on folkloric rhythm.

 "All The Way Home" –  5:17
 "Fanm (The Woman)" –  7:14
 "Lè An Gadé-w En Zyé (When I Look in Your Eyes)" –  5:43
 "Réparasyons (Reparations)" –  5:33
 "Bòd Lanmè Pa Lwen (The Beach Is Not Far)" –  6:03
 "Don’t Do It" –  7:05
 "Chambre à Échos (Echo Chamber)" –  7:51
 "La Maison En Feu (House On Fire)" –  7:18

Personnel
 Jules Buckley – Conductor

 Bokanté
 Malika Tirolien – lead vocals
 Michael League : guitar, bass, percussion, vocals
 Chris McQueen – guitars, vocals
 Bob Lanzetti – guitars, vocals
 Roosevelt Collier – steel pedal guitar, vocals
 Weedie Braimah – djembe, vocals
 Jamey Haddad – percussion
  – percussion
 André Ferrari – percussion

Metropole Orkest
 Saxophone, clarinet – David Kweksilber, Leo Janssen, Marc Scholten, Max Boeree, Nils Van Haften, Paul van der Feen, Sjoerd Dijkhuizen
 Flute – Janine Abbas, Janneke Groesz, Mariël van den Bos
 Horn – Felix Peijnenborgh, Lies Molenaars, Pieter Hunfeld, René Pagen
 Trombone – Jan Bastiani, Jan Oosting, Martijn Sohier
 Bass Trombone – Martin van den Berg
 Double Bass – Arend Liefkes, Erik Winkelmann, Tjerk de Vos
 Percussion [Orchestral] – Eddy Koopman, Murk Jiskoot
 Cello – Annie Tångberg, Emile Visser, Jascha Albracht, Maarten Jansen
 Viola – Iris Schut, Isabella Petersen, Julia Jowett, Mieke Honingh, Norman Jansen, Wouter Huizinga
 Violin [1st] – Arlia De Ruiter, Casper Donker, Christina Knoll, David Peijnenborgh, Denis Koenders, Pauline Terlouw, Sarah Koch, Vera Laporeva
 Violin [2nd] – Ewa Zbyszynska, Herman Van Haaren, Jasper van Rosmalen, Merel Jonker, Robert Baba, Ruben Margarita, Wim Kok

References

2018 albums